Émile Bastien-Lepage (20 January 1854 – 19 January 1938) was a French painter and architect, younger brother of Jules Bastien-Lepage. His works include After the War, The Darling of the Meadow and Near Damvillers.

Born in Damvillers to Claude Bastien and Adèle Lepage, he studied under Jules, who also painted his portrait in 1879, a work now in the Musée d'Orsay. He was a member of the Société des Artistes Français and exhibited at its salon in 1884 and 1889. He was also a member of the Société Nationale des Beaux-Arts and exhibited at its salon. In 1889 he also designed a plinth for Auguste Rodin's statue of Jules. Émile himself died at Neuilly-sur-Seine.

References

1854 births
1938 deaths
19th-century French male artists
19th-century French painters
20th-century French painters
20th-century French male artists
19th-century French architects
20th-century French architects
People from Meuse (department)